Benoît Quessandier (born 2 December 1985, in Mont-Saint-Aignan) is a professional French ice hockey defenceman who participated at the 2010 IIHF World Championship as a member of the France National men's ice hockey team.

Career statistics

References

External links

1985 births
French ice hockey defencemen
Living people
Dauphins d'Épinal players
Ducs de Dijon players
Merritt Centennials players
Rouen HE 76 players
Scorpions de Mulhouse players